In coding theory, rank codes (also called Gabidulin codes) are non-binary linear error-correcting codes over not Hamming but rank metric. They described a systematic way of building codes that could detect and correct multiple random rank errors. By adding redundancy with coding k-symbol word to a n-symbol word, a rank code can correct any errors of rank up to t = ⌊ (d − 1) / 2 ⌋, where d is a code distance. As an erasure code, it can correct up to d − 1 known erasures.

A rank code is an algebraic linear code over the finite field  similar to Reed–Solomon code.

The rank code corrects all errors with rank of the error vector not greater than t.

Rank metric 

Hence, every vector  over  can be written as matrix:

 

The set of all vectors  is a space .

Rank code
Such a linear rank metric code always satisfies the Singleton bound .

Generating matrix 
There are several known constructions of rank codes, which are maximum rank distance (or MRD) codes with d = n − k + 1.
The easiest one to construct is known as the (generalized) Gabidulin code, it was discovered first by Delsarte (who called it a  Singleton system) and later by Gabidulin  (and Kshevetskiy  ).

Let's define a Frobenius power  of the element  as

 

 

where .

Applications 
There are several proposals for public-key cryptosystems based on rank codes. However, most of them have been proven insecure (see e.g. Journal of Cryptology,
April 2008).

Rank codes are also useful for error and erasure correction in network coding.

See also
 Linear code
 Reed–Solomon error correction
 Berlekamp–Massey algorithm
 Network coding

Notes

References

External links
 MATLAB implementation of a Rank–metric codec

Error detection and correction
Coding theory